Kyzyl-Oktyabr may refer to the following places in the Kyrgyzstan and the Russian Federation:

Kyrgyzstan

Kyzyl-Oktyabr, Kemin, a village in Kemin District, Chuy Region
Kyzyl-Oktyabr, Jalal-Abad, a village in Bazar-Korgon District, Jalal-Abad Region
Kyzyl-Oktyabr, Özgön, a village in Özgön District, Osh Region
Kyzyl-Oktyabr, Talas, a village in Bakay-Ata District, Talas Region

Russian Federation

Kyzyl-Oktyabr, a village in Burayevsky District, Bashkortostan, Russian Federation